The Currency Creek Arboretum (CCA; or Currency Creek Arboretum Eucalypt Research Centre) is located in the Australian state of  South Australia near the small town of Currency Creek and south of the state capital of Adelaide.  CCA is a  specialist Eucalypt arboretum and research centre, composed solely of Australian native plants.

Privately owned and operated, CCA is open by appointment only and does not charge entry fees. Run by volunteers, there is no paid staff.

History
Dr. Dean Nicolle began looking for land between Mount Compass and Strathalbyn in 1990 to create an arboretum. The specific soil type he was looking for had to be well-drained, limestone-free, and with a neutral or slightly acidic pH. CCA was established in 1992. The site has a Mediterranean climate with  annual rainfall.

The first seed plantings of 18 eucalypts occurred in 1993. All seed collection points were marked with a GPS location and an herbarium voucher. Using trial and error in choosing planting distance, some trees that were initially planted too close are being replanted.

Collection
The eucalypt collection includes 1,000 species and subspecies, with over 8,000 trees. including Eucalyptus, Angophora and Corymbia. Each species is grouped in fours.

Research
Research activities includes eucalypt conservation, cultivation, ecology, physiology, systematics, and taxonomy.  Additional research consists of the cut flower industry and honey production, as well as tree use, such as firewood, shade, and windbreaks.

See also

 List of botanical gardens in Australia

References

Arboreta in Australia
Research organisations in Australia
1992 establishments in Australia
Gardens in South Australia